The 2013–14 Arizona State Sun Devils women's basketball team represented Arizona State University during the 2013–14 NCAA Division I women's basketball season. The Sun Devils, led by seventeenth year head coach Charli Turner Thorne, played their games at the Wells Fargo Arena and were members of the Pac-12 Conference. They finished with a record of 23–10 overall, 13–5 in Pac-12 play for a tie for a second-place finish. They lost in the quarterfinals in the 2014 Pac-12 Conference women's basketball tournament to USC. They were invited to the 2014 NCAA Division I women's basketball tournament which they defeated Vanderbilt in the first round before falling to Notre Dame in the second round.

Roster

Schedule

|-
!colspan=9 | Regular Season

|-
!colspan=9| 2014 Pac-12 Tournament

|-
!colspan=9| 2014 NCAA women's tournament

Rankings

See also
 2013–14 Arizona State Sun Devils men's basketball team

References

Arizona State Sun Devils women's basketball seasons
Arizona State
Arizona State
Arizonia
Arizonia